Martin Hofherr Farm is a historic home and farm located at Mount Pleasant Township, Delaware County, Indiana. The main house was built in 1905, and is a -story, Queen Anne style frame dwelling. It has a complex slate covered roof and two brick chimneys.  Also on the property are the contributing round barn (1904) and English barn (1913).

It was added to the National Register of Historic Places in 1992.

References

Round barns in Indiana
Farms on the National Register of Historic Places in Indiana
Queen Anne architecture in Indiana
Houses completed in 1905
Houses in Delaware County, Indiana
National Register of Historic Places in Delaware County, Indiana
1905 establishments in Indiana